Krippen is a railway station in the village of Krippen in the municipality of Bad Schandau, Saxony, Germany. The station was opened with the Königstein–Krippen section of the Děčín–Dresden-Neustadt railway (then known as the Saxon-Bohemian Railway—Sächsisch-Böhmische Staatseisenbahn) as Schandau station on 9 June 1850. It was renamed Krippen in 1877 when Bad Schandau station opened.

The station is served by the Dresden S-Bahn S1 service from Meißen, Dresden, Heidenau, Pirna to Schöna. There is also a Regionalbahn (National Park Railway) service every 2 hours from Děčín to Rumburk via Bad Schandau and Sebnitz.

References

External links

Network map
Krippen station at www.verkerhsmittelvergleich.de 

Railway stations in Saxony
Railway stations in Germany opened in 1850
railway station
Dresden S-Bahn stations